Nine Lives Are Not Enough is a 1941 Comedy-drama film directed by A. Edward Sutherland and written by Fred Niblo Jr. The film stars Ronald Reagan, Joan Perry, and James Gleason, with Howard Da Silva, Faye Emerson and Edward Brophy. The film was released by Warner Bros. on September 20, 1941.

Plot
A reporter tries to solve a series of boardinghouse murders. The dramatic main plot murder action is intermixed with farce and slapstick comedic elements.

Cast
 Ronald Reagan as Matt Sawyer
 Joan Perry as Jane Abbott
 James Gleason as Sgt. Sam Daniels
 Howard Da Silva as J.B. Murray, City Editor 
 Faye Emerson as Rose Chadwick
 Edward Brophy as Officer Slattery
 Peter Whitney as Roy
 Charles Drake as 'Snappy' Lucas
 Vera Lewis as Mrs. Slocum
 Ben Welden as Moxie Karper
 Howard C. Hickman as Colonel Andrews 
 Cliff Clark as Lieutenant Buckley
 Tom Stevenson as Charles
 Paul Phillips as Hot-Foot
 Joseph Crehan as Yates
 John Maxwell as Gillis

References

External links
 
 
 
 

1941 films
Warner Bros. films
1941 comedy-drama films
American comedy-drama films
American black-and-white films
Films directed by A. Edward Sutherland
Films scored by William Lava
American novels adapted into films
1940s English-language films
1940s American films